Billy Williams (born 1938) is an American Hall of Fame baseball player.

Billy Williams may also refer to:

Entertainment
 Billy Dee Williams (born 1937), actor
 Billy Drease Williams, American hip hop emcee and producer
 Billy Williams (music hall performer) (1878–1915), vaudeville entertainer
 Billy Williams (singer) (1910–1972), R&B singer
 Billy Williams (cinematographer) (born 1929), British cinematographer
 Billy Williams (record producer), American country music producer

Sports

Baseball and cricket
 Billy Williams (sportsman) (1861–1951), Middlesex and MCC cricketer, also a rugby union player, referee and administrator
 Billy Williams (cricketer, born 1887) (1887–1966), Yorkshire cricketer
 Billy Williams (right fielder) (1932–2013), baseball player for the 1969 Seattle Pilots
 Billy Williams (umpire) (1930–1998), baseball umpire

Football and rugby
 Billy Williams (American football) (born 1971), American football player
 Billy Williams (Australian footballer) (1888–?), Australian football player for St Kilda
 Billy Williams (footballer, born 1896) (1896–?), Welsh international footballer
 Billy Williams (footballer, born 1876) (1876–1929), former England and West Bromwich Albion footballer
 Billy Williams (footballer, born 1905) (1905–1994), former West Ham United and Chelsea footballer
 Billy Williams (rugby, born 1905) (1905–1973), rugby union and rugby league footballer of the 1920s and 1930s for Great Britain and Wales
 Billy Williams (rugby union, born 1929) (1929–2013), Wales and British and Irish Lions international rugby union player
 William Williams (Halifax RLFC), or Billy Williams (20th century), Welsh rugby league player for Wales and Halifax RLFC
 Billy Williams (rugby, born 1925) (1925–2007), Welsh rugby league and rugby union player

Other sports
 Billy Williams (coach) (1892–1973), American football, basketball, and baseball coach and college athletics administrator
 Billy Williams (basketball) (born 1958), retired American basketball player

Others
 Billy J. Williams (born 1956), United States Attorney for the District of Oregon
 Billy Williams (Coronation Street), fictional character on the British soap opera Coronation Street
 Billy Williams, Australian High Commissioner to Ghana from 2008 to 2013

See also
 Bill Williams (disambiguation)
 William Williams (disambiguation)